Boys and Girls is a 2000 American comedy film directed by Robert Iscove. The two main characters, Ryan (Freddie Prinze Jr.) and Jennifer (Claire Forlani), meet each other initially as adolescents, and later realize that their lives are intertwined through fate.

Plot
12-year-old Jennifer Burrows and 12-year-old Ryan Walker meet aboard an airplane and are immediately at odds. Four years later, Ryan is the mascot at his high school, while Jennifer is elected Homecoming Queen at hers. During the halftime ceremony between their two schools, Ryan is chased by the rival mascot and loses his mascot head, only to find it run over by Jennifer's ceremonial car. Jennifer later finds Ryan and tries to console him about his costume. They part ways once more, realizing they are too different.

A year later, Ryan and Jennifer are students at UC Berkeley. Ryan is in a steady relationship with his high school sweetheart Betty, and Jennifer is living with a musician. Ryan and Betty break up after realizing their differences. Ryan meets his roommate Hunter, aka Steve, a self-described ladies' man with countless elaborate (and unsuccessful) ploys for sleeping with women.

Jennifer moves in with her best friend Amy after she and her boyfriend break up. Ryan and Amy start going out, and he renews his friendship with Jennifer, even after Amy has her "breakup" with him for her. They take walks, console each other over break-ups, and gradually become best friends. Jennifer even talks Ryan into dating again, as he starts seeing a girl named Megan.

One night, in a cynical mood towards love, Jennifer breaks down and Ryan tries to console her. To their equal surprise, they have sex. Afraid of commitment, Jennifer says that sleeping together was a mistake, and that they should pretend it never happened. Hurt and lovesick, Ryan breaks up with Megan and withdraws into his studies.

As months pass, Jennifer graduates and readies herself to travel to Italy. She encounters Ryan, whom she has not seen since their night together, at a hilltop overlooking the Golden Gate Bridge. Ryan confesses his feelings towards her, but she tells him that she does not feel the same way. He wishes her well in Italy, and leaves.

On the shuttle to the airport, Jennifer passes the same hilltop where they used to spend time together and realizes that she indeed loves Ryan. She immediately races back to her apartment and finds Amy frantically getting dressed to greet her. Steve confidently strolls out of Amy's bedroom and tells Jennifer that Ryan is heading back to Los Angeles on an airplane.

While waiting for departure, Ryan hears Jennifer confess her love for him in Latin. After some convincing, and feeling the wrath of a flight attendant, they rekindle their romance where they first met — on an airplane.

Cast

Production
In April 1999, Miramax purchased the spec script by Andrew Lowery and Andrew Miller, two actors who started writing together. Robert Iscove signed on to direct, reuniting the director and star of She's All That. Iscove said Prinze "wanted to blow away that good-looking guy image and grow as an actor" by playing a geek. Prinze said, "Most people won't give me a chance to play something different than the good-looking guy. But I love trying new things; I love doing something I haven't done before, and the chance to play a geek was the reason I accepted this role in the first place."

Prinze added, "I set out a goal when I was making She's All That to do three movies for a specific generation...I did She's All That, Down to You, and Boys and Girls. Now, I've graduated from high school and college for a while."

Anna Friel was originally attached as the female lead, but Friel pulled out shortly before filming started due to reported "creative differences" and was replaced by Claire Forlani. Reports differed over whether Friel was fired or quit due to unhappiness with the script.

The film features a dance number similar to She's All That wherein everyone dances to the song "Stop the Rock" by Apollo 440. Forlani said she was given minimal notices to do it, saying "They literally pull me into this room with 30 dancers who for two days have been learning a routine that I have to learn in half an hour. And it was really complicated, too. I was in the corner … and they ordered like, the Gap kids … and I thought, 'Oh f***, I'm doomed! And Freddie said, 'Oh, I can do it.' And I said, 'Well, that's because you're not meant to get it right.'"

Jason Biggs made the film after his breakthrough role in American Pie. It was the first in a two-picture deal he had with Miramax.

Prinze said that Harvey Weinstein had wanted to put a sword fight in She's All That and in this film. He commented, "we got a note from Harvey that said they wanted to put a sword fight into [Boys and Girls] too, which made no sense because it was a contemporary piece, and Jason Biggs played an architecture student! Those were the crazy notes you'd get from the studio back in the day. I don't understand how Miramax directors didn't all go insane."

Reception
The film received mainly negative reviews. On Rotten Tomatoes, the film has a score of 11% based on reviews from 63 critics, with an average rating 3.9 out of 10. The site's critics consensus states, "Boys and Girls feels like a cheap rip-off of When Harry Met Sally. The predictable and stale story fails to engage."

Box office
The film opened at No. 6 at the North American box office, making approximately $7 million USD in its opening weekend.

References

External links
 
 
 

2000 films
American romantic comedy films
American buddy comedy films
2000s buddy comedy films
2000s English-language films
2000 romantic comedy films
Films set in San Francisco
Films set in the San Francisco Bay Area
Films shot in San Francisco
Dimension Films films
Films scored by Stewart Copeland
Films directed by Robert Iscove
2000s American films